The Schweizer Spielepreis is a Swiss board game award, awarded since 2002 in three categories: Family games, Children's games and Strategy games.  The game is awarded yearly at the Schweizer Spielmesse in October.

Awards

2006
Family games
 Fussball Ligretto (Publisher: Schmidt, Designer: Reiner Stockhausen)
 Pirates! (Publisher: Ravensburger, Designer: Reiner Knizia)
 Das grosse Dinosaurierspiel (Publisher: Kosmos, Designers: Inka and Markus Brand)
Children's games
 Nacht der Magier (Publisher: Drei Magier, Designer: Kirsten Becker, Jens-Peter Schliemann)
 Mäuseschlau und Bärenstark (Publisher: Ravensburger, Designers: Ingeborg Ahrenkiel, Cornelia Keller)
 Looping Louie (Publisher: MB Spiele)
Strategy games
 Just 4 Fun (Publisher: Kosmos, Designer: Jürgen P.K. Grunau)
 Timbuktu (Publisher: Queen Games, Designer: Dirk Henn)
 Mesopotamien (Publisher: Phalanx, Designer: Klaus Jürgen Wrede)

2005
Family games
 Verflixxt! (Publisher: Ravensburger, Designer: Wolfgang Kramer, Michael Kiesling)
 Manila (Publisher: Zoch Verlag, Designer: Franz-Benno Delonge)
 Niagara (Publisher: Zoch Verlag, Designer: Thomas Liesching)
Children's games
 Charly Quak (Publisher: Piatnik, Designeren: B. Spence & E. Donner)
 Snorta (Publisher: Amigo, Designer: Chris Childs & Tony Richardson)
 Daddy Cool (Publisher: Huch!, Designer: Heinz Meister) 
Strategy games
 Tower of Babel (Publisher: Kosmos, Designer: Reiner Knizia)
 Candamir (Publisher: Kosmos, Designer: Klaus Teuber)
 Jambo (Publisher: Kosmos, Designer: Rüdiger Dorn)

2004
Family games
 "Make 'n' Break" by Andrew Lawson and Jack Lawson
 "Ticket to Ride" by Alan R. Moon
 "Dicke Luft in der Gruft" by Norbert Proena
Children's games
 Geistertreppe by Michelle Schanen
 "Macius & Achtung, fertig los!" by Wolfgang Kramer u.a.
 "Monte Rolla" by Ulrike Gattermeyer-Kapp
Strategy games
 "Einfach genial" by Reiner Knizia
 "Anno 1503" by Klaus Teuber
 "Saint Petersburg" by Michael Tummelhofer

2003
Family games
 "Alhambra" by Dirk Henn
 "Europatour" by Alan R. Moon and Aaron Weissblum
 "Peking-Akte" by Thierry Dénoual
Children's games
 "The Kids of Catan" by Klaus Teuber
 "Max Mäuseschreck"
 "Schnapp, Land, Fluss" by Haim Shafir
Strategy games
 "Löwenherz" by Klaus Teuber
 "Amun-Re" by Reiner Knizia
 "New England" by Alan Moon and Aaron Weissblum

2002
Family games
 Heimlich & Co. by Wolfgang Kramer
 Ali Baba
 TransAmerica by Franz-Benno Delonge
Children's games
 Maskenball der Käfer
 Villa Paletti
 Froggy 
Strategy games
 Puerto Rico 
 Pirate's Cove and Nautilus

External links 
 http://www.gamemesse.ch/gamemesse/messeshop/de-ch/dept_11.html

Board game awards
Awards established in 2002
Swiss awards
2002 establishments in Switzerland